Jason Strowbridge (born September 10, 1996) is an American football defensive end who is a free agent. He played college football at North Carolina.

Early life and high school
Strowbridge grew up in Deerfield Beach, Florida and attended Deerfield Beach High School. He recorded 12 sacks as a junior. Rated a four-star recruit, Strowbridge initially committed to play college football at Kentucky but eventually changed his commitment to the University of North Carolina during his senior year.

College career
Strowbridge redshirted his true freshman season. He played defensive end as a rotational backup and finished the season with 12 tackles, 2.5 tackles for loss and two sacks. Strowbridge move to defensive tackle and became a starter at the position as a redshirt sophomore and finished the season with 34 tackles, 5.5 tackles for loss, one sack and a forced fumble. He was named honorable mention All-Atlantic Coast Conference (ACC) after recording 36 tackles, 7.5 tackles for loss and 5.5 sacks with a blocked kick in his junior season. As a senior, Strowbridge made 45 tackles (6.5 for loss) with 3.0 sacks and three fumble recoveries and was named third-team All-ACC.

Professional career
Strowbridge was selected in the fifth round of the 2020 NFL Draft by the Miami Dolphins. The Dolphins received the 154th pick used to select Strowbridge as a result from a trade that sent Minkah Fitzpatrick to the Pittsburgh Steelers. Strowbridge made his NFL debut on November 8, 2020, against the Arizona Cardinals, playing 12 snaps on defense with one tackle in 34-31 win.

On August 31, 2021, Strowbridge was waived by the Dolphins and re-signed to the practice squad the next day. He was released from the practice squad on September 6, 2021.

References

External links
North Carolina Tar Heels bio

1996 births
Living people
Players of American football from Florida
Sportspeople from Broward County, Florida
American football defensive tackles
North Carolina Tar Heels football players
People from Deerfield Beach, Florida
American football defensive ends
Miami Dolphins players